The National Automatic Merchandising Association, or NAMA, is the American national trade association of the convenience services industry, including vending, micro markets, office coffee service, and foodservice management. Headquartered in Arlington, Virginia, NAMA represents more than 1,000 member companies, including hundreds of small businesses.

Leadership 
Carla Balakgie is president and CEO of NAMA. Before joining the association in 2011, Balakgie served as CEO of the Electronic Transactions Association.

Heidi Chico, president of National Vending LLC, chairs NAMA's board of directors.

Advocacy 
In the summer, NAMA convenes an annual Fly-In, which brings more than 300 industry leaders to Washington, D.C. to discuss calorie disclosure requirements, overtime pay, and other issues affecting the convenience services industry. In a July 2017 op-ed column published in The Hill, Balakgie claimed Fly-In attendees hold more than 200 meetings with members of Congress to "ensure that the voice of the convenience services industry is heard on Capitol Hill."

References

External links
National Automatic Merchandising Association

Vending
Trade associations based in the United States
1936 establishments in the United States
Merchandising